Najia Ashar  (born 14 July 1978) is a broadcast journalist and media development professional with more than 20 years of experience in Pakistan’s mainstream media. She is the founder & president of Global Neighbourhood for Media Innovation (GNMI), a Karachi-based nonprofit organization working for media development, peacebuilding, and criminal justice system capacity building in Pakistan.

Development 
Najia established GNMI with the intention of reinventing newsrooms all across Pakistan. She has empowered thousands of media workers to report on human rights, CVE, gender-based violence and safety and security through diverse digital tools and entrepreneurial journalism. She adopted a hybrid environment mid-pandemic to reach out to journalists in remote areas to build their capacities by developing Pakistan’s first virtual Media Incubation Center and Accelerator Platform (learning management system LMS) for online training delivery and launched 20 news startups in August 2021. She is also founder and CEO of Media Baithak, a space where journalists in Pakistan gather to discuss civil society and free speech.

As of 2021, her organization also works for peacebuilding and criminal justice system capacity building. It uses state-of-the-art literacy programs and digital platforms to enable aspiring and experienced professionals to accelerate the reduction in global challenges by creating sustainable, innovative, and empowering solutions for all people. She also launched Adal oLMS, a virtual training hub for criminal justice officials in Pakistan, to enhance public confidence, access to justice, and handling of crimes by instilling self-efficacy, leadership, and resiliency skills.

Journalism 
Najia started her journalism career in 2002 at state-owned Pakistan Television as a program anchor and researcher. 

As a media professional, she has hosted a number of programs on sensitive human rights issues which included influential stakeholders of the society and worked as a host of a news morning show at GNN TV and served as Editor News Strategy and Planning at Aaj News. She also hosted a daily news show "News Hour With Najia". Prior to that she worked as a senior anchor/producer at Geo News for 12 years.

Awards 
In 2022, Najia was one of 29 global women leaders to receive a fellowship at The Poynter Institute (Leadership Academy for Women in Media) 

She also received a John S. Knight Journalism Fellowship to Stanford University from 2014 to 2015. under which she dived deeply into journalism innovation and strategic leadership in Silicon Valley and developed a practical, user-friendly safety guide for Pakistani journalists . In 2013, she received a fellowship from the East-West Center in Honolulu, Hawai'i, whom she also entered into partnership with in 2021.

Education 
Najia holds a Master's (2000) and Bachelor's degree (1999) in International Relations from the University of Karachi.

Personal life 
Najia was born in the Qasba Colony, a neighbourhood in Karachi housing diverse ethnic groups. She is married to Ashar Ali, a news executive. The couple has two children.

References

Pakistani television journalists

1978 births
Living people
University of Karachi alumni
Journalists from Karachi